Podvinje is a village in municipality of Slavonski Brod in Brod-Posavina County, Croatia.

References

Populated places in Brod-Posavina County